There are many public artworks displayed in Puebla, in the Mexican state of Puebla.

Outdoor sculptures

 Ángel Custodio
 Ángeles testigos de la Beatificación de Juan de Palafox y Mendoza
 Bust of Plácido Domingo
 Equestrian statue of Ignacio Zaragoza
 Kiosko (Hendrix)
 Maqueta del Centro de Puebla
 Monumento a la Victoria del 5 de Mayo
 Monumento a los Fundadores de Puebla
 Monumento al Sitio de Puebla
 Puebla de los Ángeles
 San Miguel Arcángel Fountain
 Statue of Álex Lora
 Statue of Esteban de Antuñano
 Statue of Héctor Azar
 Statue of Sebastian de Aparicio

Puebla
Puebla (city)
public art
public art